Darlington is a city located in Darlington County, South Carolina, United States. In 2010, its population was 6,289. It is the county seat of Darlington County. It is part of the Florence, South Carolina Metropolitan Statistical Area.

Darlington is known for its Darlington Oak and Spanish moss. Darlington is home to the famous Darlington Raceway, which hosts the annual NASCAR Southern 500 race on Labor Day weekend as well as a 400-mile spring race. It is also the site of the National Motorsports Press Association (NMPA) Hall of Fame. Darlington is also a center for tobacco farming.

Darlington is located 10 miles northwest of Florence and 76 miles northeast of the state capital, Columbia.

History

Early history
Darlington's origins date back to the mid-18th century.

Originally a heavily wooded area, the settlement of what is now Darlington County began in earnest after 1736 and 1737 when the province of South Carolina set aside a vast area of land for the Welsh Baptists of Delaware. This Welsh Tract bordered both sides of the Pee Dee River. For almost thirty years, settlers concentrated on the banks and small tributaries of the Pee Dee River. Beginning in the 1760s, and continuing into the 1770s, other groups slowly made their way into present-day Darlington, and were granted lands on the Lynches River, Jeffries Creek, and a host of other watercourses. These settlers included descendants of French Huguenots, Scots-Irish, and the English.

For 30 years following the arrival of the first settlers, local government did not exist for the citizens of the area. All deeds, estate settlements, and other legal matters had to be taken to Charles Town to be recorded. In 1769, by an Act of the Assembly, Cheraw District was established as a Judicial District. A courthouse and jail were built at Long Bluff (near present-day Society Hill), and were operational by late 1772.

After the Revolutionary War, in 1785, Cheraw District was divided into three counties, Marlborough, Chesterfield, and Darlington. Darlington County was bounded by the Pee Dee River), Lynches River, and Cedar Creek. To this day it is unknown why the county was named "Darlington", although it could be named after the North-Eastern town by the same name in County Durham, England.  After 1798 the designation "county" was changed to "district". In 1835, the city of Darlington became the new county seat. In the 1868 South Carolina Constitution, the designation reverted to "county".

Florence County was created out of parts of Darlington and Marion counties in 1888. Darlington County gave up additional territory in 1902 when Lee County was created.

Darlington Court House and Public Square
Darlington was originally built around the public square and the courthouse. Both now sit in their present location because of an argument between two men, Colonel Lamuel Benton and Captain Elias Dubose, in the late 18th century. The tale goes that the disagreement began over whether the courthouse should be located in Mechanicsville or Cuffey Town. It was said that the two compromised, each beginning in their town traveling on horseback until reaching one another. The spot where they met is now the site of the Darlington public square and courthouse. A fire in March 1806 destroyed the original courthouse. It was rumored at the time that an old woman was responsible for the flames in an attempt to burn papers connected to her coming court case. Between 1824 and 1825 it was rebuilt with brick due to a petition to build all buildings on the public square in brick to prevent the spread of fire. In 1835, the courthouse was chartered.

Historic sites
The Cashua Street-Spring Street Historic District, Julius A. Dargan House, Darlington Downtown Historic District, Darlington Industrial Historic District, Darlington Memorial Cemetery, Dove Dale, First Baptist Church, Nelson Hudson House, Manne Building, Clarence McCall House, Charles S. McCullough House, Oaklyn Plantation, St. John's Historic District, South Carolina Western Railway Station, West Broad Street Historic District, Wilds-Edwards House, and Mrs. B.F. Williamson House are listed on the National Register of Historic Places.

Early churches
In the 1820s, denominations, mostly the Baptists, met at the courthouse. The Presbyterians built the first church. With the help of donations from all denominations, the church was built with the understanding that all denominations could have access to the building. The Baptists built their church in 1831, which had been planned since 1829. The Methodists built the third church in 1834, where the Methodist Cemetery is now located. The present-day Trinity United Methodist Church sanctuary was constructed in 1901. New Providence Baptist Church is the oldest Baptist church in the city of Darlington.

The Civil War
No battles during the Civil War occurred in Darlington. One of Sherman's lieutenants, a former architect, was sent to burn down part of Darlington. When he arrived and saw a house that he had designed, he left the house and the rest of the town standing. The federal troops burned down the depot, cotton platforms and railroad trestles in 1865. During this time, St. John's Academy was used as a hospital. Federal troops also did some foraging. In 1865, Confederate troops returned through Darlington and hanged a former slave named Amy Spain on the Public Square for insurrection. After the war, the town was occupied by federal troops, which were not withdrawn until 1871. By 1865, Darlington was the headquarters for the Third Separate Brigade of the Military District of Eastern South Carolina and the Freedmen's Bureau. In 1866, during the occupation, the worst fire to ever hit Darlington burned down the court house and the jail. It was rumored that drunken federal soldiers were to blame.

The Darlington Guards
Prior to the Civil War, as the South readied itself for secession, Darlington formed the Darlington Guards. When South Carolina seceded, they were the first called upon to defend Charleston. After their term of enlistment was over, the men returned to Darlington to reenlist in regiments going to Virginia. The Darlington Guards existed at this time for almost two years. They reorganized in later years and received their own armory in 1893. They were the first in the state to volunteer for the Spanish–American War in May 1898. They were also seen by President William McKinley in Savannah, Georgia, before being sent to Cuba for occupation duties near Havana. After coming home, they continued to serve in the National Guard. In 1915 the group retired from service again, only to be reinstated and sent to the Mexican border in 1916. After returning home, they served in World War I. The last surviving member, Thomas W. Buchanan, died in 1984.

Geography
Darlington is located southeast of the center of Darlington County at  (34.301370, -79.868659). U.S. Routes 52 and 401 bypass the city on the southwest. South Carolina Highway 34 passes through the center of Darlington, leading east  to Dillon and west  to Bishopville.

It is mostly famous for hosting the Southern 500 in the NASCAR Cup Series, one of the championship's most enduring events.

Climate
Darlington has a humid subtropical climate (Köppen Cfa) typical of the Carolinas. Summers are hot with frequent thunderstorms breaking up the humid heat. In late summer where the Southern 500 is run, the humidity leads to frequent rain delays and difficult environments for drivers, team personnel and spectators. This leads to the event being hosted as a night race. Winters are mostly mild, but being inland there are occasional cold snaps. Darlington has a rainy climate, although normal for the region. Between 1991 and 2020 during the normal precipitation measurement, Darlington received 104 days of either rain or snow, indicating heavy accumulation during those episodes. Most years have no snow accumulation due to the mild temperatures and cold temperatures are associated with dry weather. In spite of this, Darlington has occasionally recorded some minor inches of depth during brief snowfalls.

The record cold was  during the 1985 North American cold wave. While winter nights average right on the air frost limit, ice days are not very frequent in general. Nights often cool down a bit compared to the coastline in summer. Even so, peak summer nights beneath  are unknown and there have been two separate  lows recorded in Darlington. Between 1991 and 2020, the warmest low averaged .

Demographics

2020 census

As of the 2020 United States Census, there were 6,149 people, 2,692 households, and 1,514 families residing in the city.

2010 census
As of the 2010 United States Census, there were 6,289 people living in the city. The racial makeup of the city was 60.4% Black, 37.7% White, 0.2% Native American, 0.4% Asian, <0.1% from some other race and 0.5% from two or more races. 0.7% were Hispanic or Latino of any race.

2000 census
As of the census of 2000, there were 6,720 people, 2,812 households, and 1,765 families living in the city. The population density was 1,565 people per square mile (604.8/km2). There were 3,140 housing units at an average density of 731.7 per square mile (282.6/km2). The racial makeup of the city was 56.04% African American, 42.50% White,  0.16% Native American, 0.36% Asian, 0.01% Pacific Islander, 0.51% from other races, and 0.42% from two or more races. Hispanic or Latino of any race was 1.01% of the population.

There were 2,812 households, out of which 27.3% had children under the age of 18 living with them, 34.3% were married couples living together, 24.9% had a female householder with no husband present, and 37.2% were non-families. 34.3% of all households were made up of individuals, and 14.5% had someone living alone who was 65 years of age or older. The average household size was 2.30 and the average family size was 2.96.

In the city, the population was spread out, with 25.2% under the age of 18, 8.7% from 18 to 24, 23.3% from 25 to 44, 23.9% from 45 to 64, and 18.9% who were 65 years of age or older. The median age was 39 years. For every 100 females, there were 79.4 males. For every 100 females age 18 and over, there were 70.4 males.

The median income for a household in the city was $24,869, and the median income for a family was $33,971. Males had a median income of $28,110 versus $20,206 for females. The per capita income for the city was $15,454. About 24.9% of families and 29.4% of the population were below the poverty line, including 38.9% of those under age 18 and 29.5% of those age 65 or over.

Education

In 1818, Darlington's growth proved time to build a school. The first schoolhouse opened was named The Darlington Academy. In 1860, the name was changed to St. John's Academy. This building served educational purposes, as well as the site for fund-raising and the lottery. St. John's Academy was later renamed St. John's High School. Later during renovation, St. John's Elementary School was added, followed by the move to a new school in 1977. It was renamed Darlington High School, when it was combined with Mayo High School in 1995.

In September 2006, work was finished on The Darlington County Institute of Technology, Darlington Middle School, and Hartsville Middle School.

After desegregation in South Carolina in 1970, Mayo High School became a magnet school called The Mayo High School for Math, Science, and Technology.

Today, the Darlington County School District serves as the governing body over all schools in the county.

Darlington has a public library, a branch of the Darlington County Library System.

In popular culture
Darlington was mentioned in the Bruce Springsteen song "Darlington County", off his 1984 album Born in the U.S.A.

A 2012 article in Small Wars Journal explored a hypothetical military operation in which an extremist group sympathetic to the Tea Party movement takes over Darlington and clashes with federal troops. Conservative groups criticized the article, suggesting it reflected misplaced priorities.

The town plays a major role in the season 2 episode "The Darlington 500" of the NBC series Timeless. In the episode, Lucy, Wyatt, and Rufus travel to September 4, 1955, to stop a Rittenhouse agent from destroying the Darlington 500 with a bomb, which would allow Rittenhouse to take over the American Automobile Industry.

Darlington is the hometown of Marvel Comics supervillain, Zelda DuBois, Princess Python. She first appeared in The Amazing Spider-Man #22 in March of 1965, being created by Stan Lee and Steve Ditko.

Notable people

 David Beasley, 113th Governor of South Carolina (1995–99), executive director of World Food Programme
 Harry Byrd, Major League Baseball pitcher, 1952 Rookie of the Year
 James Lide Coker, businessman, philanthropist, founder of Coker College
 Dorsey Dixon, musician and songwriter
 William G. Farrow, participant in Doolittle Raid
 Tommy Gainey, professional golfer, PGA Tour
 Raymond A. Harris, former chairman of South Carolina Republican Party
 Gloria Hines, first African-American, as well as first female, to be elected and serve as mayor of Darlington (2016-20)
 Orlando Hudson, Major League Baseball player for San Diego Padres
 Buddy Johnson, jazz musician
 Ella Johnson, singer
 Evander M. Law, Civil War general
 David Rogerson Williams, governor and scientific experimenter, introduced mule to Southern agriculture
 Hyman Witcover, architect

References

External links
City of Darlington official website

 
Cities in South Carolina
Cities in Darlington County, South Carolina
County seats in South Carolina
Florence, South Carolina metropolitan area
Populated places established in 1736